The Assassin  is a 2023 South Korean historical action-drama film written and directed by Kwak Jeong-deok. Starring Shin Hyun-joon, Lee Moon-sik, and Kim Min-kyung, the film depicts story of Lee Nan, Joseon's best swordsman, in front of an irreversible fate in a world of chaos.  

It was released theatrically in South Korea on February 22, 2023.

Cast
 Shin Hyun-joon as Lee Nan
 Lee Moon-sik as Lee Bang
 Kim Min-kyung as Seon-hong
 Hong Eun-ki as Dal-gi
 Lee Jung-min as Yawol
 Choi Sung-won
 Kim Byung-chun
 Park Jae-hoon
 Kim Je-yeol

Production

On October 26, 2021, the casting of the film confirmed by DH Media. Shin Hyun-joon was cast in leading role of Lee Nan, the best salsu in Joseon, along with Lee Moon-shik, Kim Min-kyung, Hong Eun-ki, Choi Seong-won, Kim Byeong-chun, Park Jae-hoon, and Kim Je-yeol in supporting roles. Filming began on the same day. Later in November 2021, Lee Jung-min joined the cast in the role of Yawol, a hypnotic killer.

Reception

The film was released on February 22, 2023 on 188 screens. , with gross of US$25,282 and 3,593 admissions, it is at the 31st place among the South Korean films released in 2023.

References

External links
 
 
 

2023 films
2023 action films
2020s South Korean films
2020s Korean-language films
2020s historical action films
South Korean historical action films